Drillia inornata is a species of sea snail, a marine gastropod mollusk in the family Drilliidae.

Description
The shell attains a length of 18 mm.

Distribution
This species occurs in the demersal zone of the Pacific Ocean from the Gulf of California, Western Mexico, to Ecuador

References

  Tucker, J.K. 2004 Catalog of recent and fossil turrids (Mollusca: Gastropoda). Zootaxa 682:1–1295 
 McLean & Poorman, 1971. New species of Tropical Eastern Pacific Turridae; The Veliger, 14, 89–113

External links
 

inornata
Gastropods described in 1971